The Asia/Oceania Zone was one of the three zones of the regional Davis Cup competition in 2001.

In the Asia/Oceania Zone there were four different tiers, called groups, in which teams compete against each other to advance to the upper tier. Winners in Group II advanced to the Asia/Oceania Zone Group I. Teams who lost their respective ties competed in the relegation play-offs, with winning teams remaining in Group II, whereas teams who lost their play-offs were relegated to the Asia/Oceania Zone Group III in 2002.

Participating nations

Draw

 and  relegated to Group III in 2002.
 promoted to Group I in 2002.

First round

Kuwait vs. Lebanon

Hong Kong vs. Iran

Syria vs. Malaysia

Chinese Taipei vs. Pakistan

Second round

Lebanon vs. Hong Kong

Malaysia vs. Chinese Taipei

Relegation play-offs

Kuwait vs. Iran

Syria vs. Pakistan

Third round

Lebanon vs. Chinese Taipei
Lebanon defeated Chinese Taipei by walkover. The tie was scheduled to be held at the Country Club in Yarze, Lebanon between 2 and 4 November 2001.

References

External links
Davis Cup official website

Davis Cup Asia/Oceania Zone
Asia Oceania Zone Group II